Ladoga is an unincorporated community located in the towns of Springvale and Waupun, Fond du Lac County, Wisconsin, United States.

History
Ladoga means "rising sun" in a Native American language.

The post office was opened in July 1851 by its first postmaster, Marcus Brown.

Notable people
Chester Hazen, businessman, farmer, and politician

Images

References

Unincorporated communities in Fond du Lac County, Wisconsin
Unincorporated communities in Wisconsin